Stelio De Carolis (14 November 1937 – 22 December 2017) was an Italian politician who was a member of the Chamber of Deputies from 1987 to 1994. He served on the Senate between 1996 and 2001. De Carolis was struck by a car on 22 December 2017 while crossing the Viale Primo Maggio in Meldola and died at the age of 80.

He had a long-time political and close personal friendship with the secretary of the Italian Republican Party Oliviero Widmer Valbonesi.

References

1937 births
2017 deaths
People from the Province of Frosinone
Italian Republican Party politicians
Democrats of the Left politicians
Deputies of Legislature X of Italy
Deputies of Legislature XI of Italy
Senators of Legislature XIII of Italy
Politicians of Lazio
Road incident deaths in Italy
Pedestrian road incident deaths
Italian Freemasons